Alfred Augustus Watts (1862–1928), also known as A. A. Watts, was a British communist.

Born in Bow, London, Watts became a compositor and joined the Social Democratic Federation (SDF).  In 1904, he became a member of the Board of Guardians in Poplar, a post he held until his death.  After the SDF became the British Socialist Party, Watts became a leader of the majority anti-war faction, and was elected to the party executive as Treasurer, alongside Albert Inkpin and John Maclean.  He was a supporter of the October Revolution and of the formation of the Communist Party of Great Britain (CPGB).

In 1919, Watts was elected as a Labour Party member of London County Council in Battersea North, and in 1922 he was re-elected for the CPGB.  In 1925, he  was elected as a Councillor for Poplar Council, with the support of both Labour and the CPGB.

References

Graham Stevenson, Compendium of Communist Biography

1862 births
1928 deaths
British Socialist Party members
Communist Party of Great Britain councillors
Members of London County Council
Social Democratic Federation members